Cib or CIB may refer to:

Places 
 Cib, a village in Almașu Mare Commune, Alba County, Romania
 Čib, today Čelarevo, a village in the Bačka Palanka Municipality, South Bačka District, Serbia
 Cib (river) in Alba and Hunedoara Counties, Romania

Politics and business 
 Campaign for an Independent Britain, a cross-party Eurosceptic campaign group
 Companies Investigation Branch, part of the UK's Department for Business, Enterprise and Regulatory Reform
 Confederazione Italiana di Base (CIB) Unicobas, a socialist union in Italy

Banks 
 Cairo International Bank, a commercial bank in Uganda

 CIB, the NYSE symbol CIB for Bancolombia
 CIB Bank, a commercial bank in Hungary
 Commercial International Bank, a bank in Egypt
 Corporate and Institutional Banking, an arm of BNP Paribas

Military and police 
 Central Investigation Bureau, the national investigation agency of Nepal which is run under Nepal Police
 Combat Infantryman Badge, a United States Army military award
 Commonwealth Investigation Branch, a former federal law enforcement organisation in Australia
 Complaints Investigation Bureau, a defunct unit of London's Metropolitan Police, replaced by the Directorate of Professional Standards
 Criminal Investigation Branch, one of the main branches of the New Zealand Police
 Criminal Investigation Bureau, an agency of Taiwan Police
 Cutter Information Book

Other uses
 Cardiff Institute for the Blind, Wales 
 Common data link (CDL) Interface Box
 Complete in Box, a form of video game packaging.
 Controlled image base, unclassified digital imagery produced by the National Geospatial Intelligence Agency
 Cosmic infrared background, a mysterious infrared light coming from outer space

See also 
 Chib (disambiguation)